Kyabandara is a parish in Kamwenge Subcounty, Kamwenge District in western Uganda. It is predominantly a rural parish with Nfashumwana and Kyabandara as the main trading centres. It neighbors Nkongoro to the South West and Ganyenda to the South.

References

Kamwenge District